Sébastien Ndjana Kana (born 18 November 1983) is a professional Cameroonian footballer who last played as a defender for Union Douala.

Career
Kana Ndzana was born in Yaoundé, Cameroon. After beginning his footballing career with Jeunesse Star Yaoundé, Mount Cameroon F.C. and Canon Yaoundé, he joined Coton Sport FC de Garoua in 2002. He was a key figure in Coton Sport's run to the 2008 CAF Champions League Final, scoring a goal in the club's semi-final win over Dynamos F.C. He also captained the side to a domestic league and cup double in 2008.

Kana Ndzana represented Cameroon at youth level, and was selected for the senior national team twice (without making a competitive appearance). He did play for the local national team, winning two editions of the CEMAC Cup.

After he retired from playing, Kana Ndzana became a football coach. He managed Sporting FC through a promotion to Cameroon's regionalized third level of club football in 2019.

References

External links

Profile and Pictures - www.cotonsport.com
Interview

1983 births
Living people
Cameroonian footballers
Association football defenders
Coton Sport FC de Garoua players
Mount Cameroon F.C. players
Union Douala players